Kfar Barukh (lit. Baruch Village) is a moshav in northern Israel. Located near Afula, it falls under the jurisdiction of Jezreel Valley Regional Council.

History
The moshav was founded in 1926 by immigrants from the Bulgaria, Caucasus, Kurdistan and Romania. It was named after Baruch Kahane, a Jewish philanthropist in Romania who founded the village.

References

External links
Official website

Moshavim
Populated places established in 1926
Populated places in Northern District (Israel)
1926 establishments in Mandatory Palestine
Caucasus diasporas
Bulgarian-Jewish culture in Israel
Kurdish-Jewish culture in Israel
Romanian-Jewish culture in Israel